The São Bento Fountain is a fountain located in Corticeiro de Baixo, Carapelhos, Mira, Portugal.

The fountain is dedicated to Saint Benedict.

It was revamped in 1999.

Fountains in Portugal
Buildings and structures in Coimbra District